Marie (Mimi) Bolette Wilhelmine Falsen (29 May 1861 –29 January 1957) was a Norwegian painter. Her main theme were figure pictures and portraits.

Biography
Falsen was born in Bergen, Norway. Her father, Enevold Munch Falsen (1810-1880) was a judge. Her grandfather, Christian Magnus Falsen (1782-1830) had been a  Supreme Court Justice.

She attended the Académie Colarossi and the Académie Bouve, both in Paris. She also studied  with Richard Bergh and Anders Zorn in Stockholm, Sweden and with Niels Skovgaard and Viggo Pedersen in Copenhagen, Denmark. She returned to Norway in 1905.
and in 1909 established her studio  in Asker.

After her debut in 1891, she participated in Høstutstillingen  almost every year  until 1956.
She exhibited frequently at the Oslo Kunstforening and the  Charlottenborg Spring Exhibition (Charlottenborgutstillingen).
Falsen  exhibited her work at the Palace of Fine Arts at the 1893 World's Columbian Exposition in Chicago, Illinois. 

In 1905 Falsen founded  Painting Federation (Malerinneforbundet)   and in 1928 she founded the Federation of Visual Artists (Bildende Kunstnerins).

Falsen died in Bærum.

References

1861 births
1957 deaths
Norwegian women painters
19th-century Norwegian women artists
20th-century Norwegian women artists
19th-century Norwegian painters
20th-century Norwegian painters
Artists from Bergen
Académie Colarossi alumni